Samhain is a Gaelic festival.

Samhain may also refer to:
 Samhain (band), an American rock band
 Samhain (magazine), an Irish theatrical periodical
 Samhain (software), a file integrity checker
 Samhain (Ghostbusters), a character from The Real Ghostbusters

See also
 Sam Hain (b. 1995), cricketer
 Irish mythology in popular culture
 Samhan, a period in early Korean history